Dharmasthala() (earlier known as Kuduma) is an Indian temple town on the banks of the Nethravathi River in the Belthangady taluk of the Dakshina Kannada district in Karnataka, India.  

The town is known for its centuries old Dharmasthala Temple devoted to the Hindu god Manjunatha. There are other temples and shrines that are dedicated to Ammanavaru, Chandranath and the Dharma Daivas (guardian spirits of Dharma) — Kalarahu, Kalarkayi, Kumaraswamy and Kanyakumari. The temple is unusual in that it is a Hindu temple run by a Jain administration and poojas are conducted by Hindu priests who subscribe to the Vaishnava ideologies. Most Shiva temple are run by Shaivas as opposed to the Madhava Bhramins who are devotees of Vishnu and his avatars. On average the temple attracts around 10,000 pilgrims a day.

Legend

Local legend says that the Shiva Linga was brought to Dharmasthala by Annappa who is believed to have worked for the Dharmasthala Heggade family. Annappa is thought to have installed the Shiva Linga after his master expressed his interest in offering his services to lord shiva. The Shiva Linga which was installed over night by Annappa not far from the Heggade household was alleged to be moved from the Kadri Temple, after which Annappa is said to have disappeared.

800 years ago, Dharmasthala was known as Kuduma (ಕುಡುಮ) in Mallarmadi, then a village in Belthangady (ಬೆಳ್ತಂಗಡಿ). Here lived the Jain chieftain Birmanna Pergade and his wife Ammu Ballathi in a house called Nelliadi Beedu. Pergade and the local chieftains built several shrines and invited Brahmin priests to perform the rituals. These priests requested Pergade to install a Shivalinga beside the native Daivas. The Daivas then sent their vassal Annappa Swamy to procure the linga of Lord Manjunatheshwara (ಶ್ರೀ ಮಂಜುನಾಥೇಶ್ವರ ಸ್ವಾಮಿ) from Kadri, near Mangalore. Subsequently, the Manjunatha temple was built around the linga.

Around the 16th century, Shri Devaraja Heggade invited Shri Vadiraja Swami of Udupi to visit the place. The swamiji gladly came but refused to accept Bhiksha (food offering) because the idol of Lord Manjunatha had not been consecrated according to the vedic rites. Shri Heggade then requested the Swamiji to reconsecrate the Shiva Linga himself. Pleased by the observance of the vedic rites and Heggade's charity to all, the Swamiji named the place Dharmasthala the abode of religion and charity. Thus, the roots of charity and religious tolerance established by the Pergades 800 years ago have been nurtured and strengthened by 21 generations of the Heggade family of Tulu lineage (Heggade being a derivative from Tulu word Pergade). Today's Dharmasthala blossoms with the fruit of this selfless dedication.

Museums

Sri Manjunatheshwara Cultural and Research foundation, started by the Temple committee, is engaged in preserving ancient manuscripts and paintings. A museum of antique objects has been established called "Manjusha Museum" and a car museum houses a rare collection of vintage cars.

Traditional folk arts like Yakshagana and ethnic crafts like Navalgund carpets and Kasturi embroidery are revived by Dr. Heggade.   Shri Dharmasthala Manjunatheshwara Dharmothana Trust is engaged in renovation of temples across Karnataka and every year, a Sarva Dharma Sammelana (multi-religious meet) is held at Dharmasthala, where spiritual leaders from various faiths and schools participate.

Bahubali statue

In 1973, a statue of Lord Bahubali, carved out of a single rock, was installed at Dharmasthala on a low hill near the Manjunatha Temple. It is about 39 feet (12 m) high, has a 13 feet high pedestal and weighs about 175 tonnes. This is one of the five stone statues of Bahubali in Karnataka.

Social Service

Shri Kshetra Dharmasthala Rural Development Project 
One project is called Shri Kshetra Dharmasthala Rural Development Project, which organizes activities for rural development. Its employees go to villages to make small groups called Shree Shakti Sangha and provide bank loans to group members for business. They ensure supply of drinking water to villages in summer.

Mass Marriages
To fight the dowry system and to cut unnecessary expenses involved in the celebration of marriages, Dr. Veerendra Heggade (ಡಾ|| ವೀರೇಂದ್ರ ಹೆಗ್ಗಡೆ) started free mass marriages in 1972. Annual mass marriages are held usually during April every year. As of 2013, 10,698 couples have been married in mass marriages arranged by the Dharmasthala Temple Committee. The expenses of the wedding dress, the mangalasutra and a wedding feast for a limited number of the couple's guests are borne by the Shri Kshetra.

Anna dana (ಅನ್ನದಾನ)
The average number of pilgrims per day to the temple is about 10,000. Every one of the pilgrims who visits Shri Kshetra Dharmasthala is treated like an honored guest, irrespective of caste, creed, culture or status. The "Anna Dana" (Food Donation) is one of the impressive aspects of this place. Free food is provided to the devotees. The temple has modern machinery. It makes quality food continuously, throughout the day. The dining hall is known as "Annapurna".

Vidya dana (ವಿದ್ಯಾ ದಾನ)
Shree Kshetra Dharmasthala, by the SDMCET Society, manages 25 educational institutions, ranging from primary schools, Gurukulas to teach yoga, Sanskrit, etc., to colleges having professional courses in engineering, medicine and dental science in Dharmasthala, Ujire, Mangalore, Udupi, Dharwad, Hassan, Mysore and a few other places in the state of Karnataka.

The Siddavana Gurukula started by Late Shri Manjayya Heggade has become a model educational institution. Over 250 students are provided free lodging and board and learn Yoga & Sanskrit, in addition to the basic school curriculum. The speciality of this institution is its endeavor to teach values based on Indian culture.

Educational institutions
Several educational institutes are managed by the temple trust committee:
SDM College, Ujire
SDM College of Engineering and Technology, Dharwad
SDM College of Medical Sciences, Dharwad
SDM College of Dental Sciences, Dharwad
MMK and SDM Women’s College, Mysore
SDM Institute for Management Development, Mysore
SDM Law College, Mangalore
SDM BBM College, Mangalore
SDM Ayurvedic College, Udupi
SDM Secondary School, Ujire
SDM English Medium School, Ujire
SDM College of Ayurveda, Hassan
SDM Ayurveda Hospital, Hassan
Ruthnumaanusa Vidyaarthi Nilaya, Ujire
SDM College of Naturopathy and Yogic Sciences, Ujire
SDM College of Engineering and Technology, Ujire
SDM Industrial Training Centre, Vennuru
SDM Mungulla Jyoti Integrated School, Vamanjoor
SDM College of Arts and Science, Honnavar

Aushadhi daana (ಔಷಧ ದಾನ)
In the field of health care, the medical trust provides services to eradicate and prevent many diseases. The mobile hospital is equipped to deal with emergencies and to provide medical treatment to the people in remote parts of the Malenadu area. A modern tuberculosis sanitorium was built by Dharmasthala Manjunatheshwara Medical Trust to give relief to patients of tuberculosis. It has since been converted into a general hospital. The Ayurvedic Hospitals at Udupi and Hassan provide Ayurvedic medicines as per the ancient texts. The Nature Cure Hospital, built on the banks of the Netravati River, uses a system based on the five elements of Air, Earth, Ether, Water and Light.

SDM Eye Hospital at Mangalore is a modern, scientific eye treatment center. The SDM Dental Hospital both serves regular dental needs and also provides specialized treatments such as oral implants, surgery for cleft lip and other orthodontic surgeries.

Shri Heggede has been actively involved in propagating the practice of Yoga, the ancient system of fitness. Surya Namaskar Camps are regularly organized, where Yoga is taught. Further, 250 high school teachers are trained in Yoga every year.

Heggade family
The present head of Dharmasthala, Padma Vibhushan Dr. D. Veerendra Heggade, the 21st in succession to the Dharmadhikari Peetha, has launched several socio-economic programmes such as free mass weddings which were started in 1973.

Dharmasthala is among the few pilgrim centers in India that provides boarding and lodging to all the visiting devotees at a cheap cost.

Transportation

By Road 
Dharmasthala is well connected by road. State-owned KSRTC & also private companies provide bus service from several centers of Karnataka.

By Train 
Mangalore Railway Station is the nearest railway junction to Dharmasthala, situated at a distance of about 74 km. The railway station is well connected to all the major cities and towns in India. Travellers can hire taxis/cabs or take buses to reach Dharmasthala from Mangalore.

By Air 
Mangalore Airport serves as the nearest domestic and international airport for tourists heading to Dharmasthala. Earlier known as the Bajpe Airport, it is situated at a distance of about 65 km from Dharmasthala. The flights connect to major Middle East destinations like Dubai, Abu Dhabi etc. Besides, it is also ideal for travellers coming from Mumbai, Bangalore, Goa, Kochi, Calicut and other major Indian destinations.

Places of interest nearby

Bahubali Statue is near the temple on a small hill. It is revered by Jains as a symbol of sacrifice. Kukke Subramanya Temple dedicated to Lord Subramanya is just 62 km from Dharmasthala. Kalasa, Sringeri and Horanadu are less than 100 km from Dharmasthala.

References

External links

 Official website
 Shri Kshethra Dharmasthala Rural Development Project

Cities and towns in Dakshina Kannada district
Colossal Jain statues in India